Blackman Eddy is a village located on the banks of the Belize River in the Cayo District, Belize. The George Price Highway runs through the middle of the village. For sure a good place to be at. 

Blackman Eddy is where the local Maya hid from the Spanish.

References 

Populated places in Cayo District
Cayo South